The 2011 Aircel Chennai Open was a tennis tournament played on outdoor hard courts. It was the 16th edition of the Chennai Open, and part of the 250 series of the 2011 ATP World Tour. It took place at the SDAT Tennis Stadium in Chennai, India, from 3 January through 9 January 2011.

Players

Seeds

Qualifiers

Draw

First qualifier

Second qualifier

Third qualifier

Fourth qualifier

References

2011 Aircel Chennai Open
Aircel Chennai Open - Singles Qualifying